INS Jarawa is a naval base of the Indian Armed Forces under the joint-services Andaman and Nicobar Command located in Port Blair in the Andaman & Nicobar Islands. It was commissioned in 1964.

INS Utkrosh is an adjacent naval air station. INHS Dhanvantari is a naval hospital on the base. A Floating Dock Navy (FDN-1) of nearly 40,000 tonnes is also operated to dock many vessels under the A&N Command. A second, smaller floating dock (FDN-2) was also ordered in 2010.

History
After the 1962 Sino-Indian War, the Navy was tasked with the defence of the Andaman & Nicobar Islands. Preparations for setting up naval establishments on the islands started in November 1962. In mid 1963, the first naval garrison of 5 officers and 156 sailors arrived in Port Blair. After the Seaward class defense boats were deployed to the islands, a maintenance and repair facility was created to support these small craft. INS Jarawa was then commissioned in 1964 as the base to oversee all naval operations on the islands. The base is named for the indigenous adivasi Jarawa tribe of the Andaman islands.

, an amphibious warfare ship, was the first major vessel to have INS Jarawa as its home port. Construction of a naval wharf for the base started in 1968. Comprehensive ship repair facilities were commissioned at the base in 1979.

On 6 November 2002, the 180 meter long floating drydock FDN1 sank in 24 meters of water off Port Blair. Only the dock crane tops remained above water. A Svitzer Salvage team from Singapore and The Netherlands, aided by the salvage vessel Perdana Sakti, was engaged to refloat the drydock. After a 3-day lifting operation, the drydock was returned to the Indian Navy on 15 February 2003.

Band
The INS Jarawa Band is currently attached to the ship and based in Port Blair. The band was created in 1985 and has been a key component of military-civil relations in the city. It performed at various venues such as Raj Niwas, Port Blair, Netaji Subhash Chandra Bose Island, Marina Park. It also performs its standard music at Republic Day and Independence Day parades as well as during international events and good-will visits of Indian and foreign warships.

See also
 Indian navy 
 List of Indian Navy bases
 List of active Indian Navy ships

 Integrated commands and units
 Armed Forces Special Operations Division
 Defence Cyber Agency
 Integrated Defence Staff
 Integrated Space Cell
 Indian Nuclear Command Authority
 Indian Armed Forces
 Special Forces of India

 Other lists
 Strategic Forces Command
 List of Indian Air Force stations
 List of Indian Navy bases
 India's overseas military bases

References

Jarawa